Drone (born August 8, 1991 in Ciudad Nezahualcóyotl, Mexico State, Mexico) is the current ring name of a Mexican luchador enmascarado, or masked professional wrestler who works for the Mexican professional wrestling promotion Consejo Mundial de Lucha Libre (CMLL) portraying a tecnico ("Good guy") wrestling character. Until October 2016 he was known as Hombre Bala Jr., Spanish for "Human Cannonball Junior" (or literally "Bullet Man" Junior), reflecting the fact that one of his father's most known ring names was "Hombre Bala". Drone's real name is not a matter of public record, as is often the case with masked wrestlers in Mexico where their private lives are kept a secret from the wrestling fans.

Personal life
Hombre Bala Jr.s full name is not publicly known, which is traditionally the case in Lucha Libre when a wrestler has never been unmasked, but it is known that his paternal last name is Ortiz, revealed when his father Aurelio Ortiz Villavicencio was unmasked. Ortiz is a part of the "Ortiz wrestling family", sometimes referred to as the "Pirata" family. As his ring name indicates he is the son of Hombre Bala, Aurelio Ortiz Villavicencio who also competed as Monsther and a number other enmascarado (masked) characters over the years, and India Sioux, a retired wrestler.

He has three siblings who are also active in professional wrestling, his sister works under the same ring name as their mother, India Sioux, and his two brothers work as Corsario and Monsther (member of Los Invasores). Bala Jr. is the nephew of wrestlers Pirata Morgan and La Marquesa and the cousin of professional wrestlers Rey Bucanero, Hijo de Pirata Morgan, Pirata Morgan Jr. and Perla Negra.

Professional wrestling career
Hombre Bala Jr. made his professional wrestling debut in late 2007, after being trained by his father, and initially worked on for independent wrestling promotions around Mexico City. Soon after his debut he began working at the Consejo Mundial de Lucha Libre (CMLL) wrestling school under Talismán, Arkangel de la Muerte and Shocker for his CMLL debut. Bala broke his leg in a motorcycle accident and spent a month in the hospital to recover, delaying his planned CMLL debut.

Consejo Mundial de Lucha Libre (2011–present)
CMLL introduced Generacion 2011 in early 2011 which a group of young wrestlers who all made their debut around the same time, they were not considered an actual group, more of a graduating class of the CMLL wrestling schools. Generacion 2011 included Hombre Bala Jr., Magnus, Dragon Lee, Enrique Vera Jr., Super Halcón Jr., Hijo del Signo and Bobby Zavala. He made his in-ring debut for CMLL on January 11, 2011, teaming with Metálico and Ángel Azteca Jr. Hombre Bala Jr. portrayed a tecnico ("good guy") character as his team lost to Los Guerreros Tuareg (Hooligan and Doctor X and the Durango Kid, but was said to have shown that he had skills even in defeat.

CMLL held a Forjando un Ídolo (Spanish for "Forgin an idol") tournament in April and May, 2011, with the purpose of identifying which of the 16 "Rookies" in the tournament would move up the ranks of the promotion. The tournament consisted of two rounds, first a round-robin group round, with the top 2 in each of the four groups competing in an elimination tournament. Hombre Bala Jr.'s inclusion in the tournament was the first real exposure he was given while in CMLL. He defeated Puma King but lost to both Diamante and Hijo del Signo, leaving him with only three points, not enough to advance to the next round.

He entered the 2011 Torneo Gran Alternativa tournament, a tag team tournament that sees a rookie randomly teamed up with an experienced wrestler for a tournament, in this case Hombre Bala Jr. teamed up with La Máscara, only to lose in the opening round to Dragon Lee and Volador Jr. The following month Hombre Bala Jr. was part of a tournament to find a new CMLL World Super Lightweight Champion as the title was vacated. He was eliminated in the opening round torneo cibernetico, which was won by Guerrero Maya Jr.

CMLL had been promoting a feud between the Generacion 2011 rookies and a number of veteran low to mid-card rudos ("Bad guys") throughout most of 2011. By late 2011 that storyline began focusing more and more on the rivalry between the team of Hombre Bala Jr. and Super Halcón Jr. from Generacion 2011 and a brother team known as Los Rayos Tapatío ("The Lightning bolts from Guadalajara"; Rayo Tapatío I and Rayo Tapatío II). The two sides faced off several  matches where the two teams would focus more on each other than the other men in the matches. As the storyline escalated the four wrestlers involved would tear at each other's masks, at times winning by pulling the mask off the other one to gain an unfair advantage, escalating the conflict. After months of escalating the storyline CMLL finally announced that the two teams would face off in a Lucha de Apuesta ("Bet Match") where both teams would put their masks on the line and would be forced to unmask if they lost the match. The Luchas de Apuestas match took place on CMLL's first show of 2012 in Arena Mexico.

The young team defeated the veterans, earning them their first major victory in CMLL. Following the match Los Rayos discussed leaving CMLL, humiliated by the loss of their masks. CMLL held a 16-man tournament focusing primarily on rookies called Torneo Sangre Nueva ("The New Blood Tournament") in March, 2012 which saw Hombre Bala Jr. among the participants. He competed in the second block of the tournament, eliminated from the torneo cibernetico by fellow Generacion 2011 wrestler Hijo del Signo.

Just like in 2011 Hombre Bala Jr. also competed in the 2012 Torneo Gran Alternativa, this time teaming up with Marco Corleone, but once again he would be eliminated in the first round after losing to Atlantis and Tritón. Hombre Bala Jr.  was one of 18 wrestlers who competed in the second annual Torneo Sangre Nueva tournament. He competed in qualifying Block A on February 26, 2012 for a place in the finals, the other wrestlers in Block A included Soberano Jr., Camaleón, Stigma, Höruz, Akuma, Espanto Jr., Herodes Jr., Cholo and Bobby Zavala who competed in a torneo cibernetico, multi-man elimination match. He eliminated both Espanto Jr. and Bobby Zavala and was the last man eliminated by eventual tournament winner Sorberano Jr.

In late March, 2013 Hombre Bala Jr. was announced as one of the Novatos, or rookies, in the 2013 Torneo Gran Alternativa, or "Great Alternative tournament", being one of the few wrestlers to compete in both the 2012 and 2013 tournament as a rookie. Hombre Bala Jr. would team up with veteran Atlantis, the very man that unmasked his father years earlier, and compete in Block A on April 12, 2013. The duo defeated Akuma and Mephisto in the first round, Taurus and Averno in the second round and Guerrero Negro Jr. and Atlantis long time rival Último Guerrero in the semi-finals to earn a spot in the finals. The finals took place on April 26, 2013 during the Arena Mexico 57th Anniversary Show and saw Boby Zavala and Rey Escorpión defeat Hombre Bala Jr. and Atlantis, two falls to one to win the 2013 Gran Alternativa tournament.

On October 18, 2016 CMLL introduced the enmascarado character Drone, presented as a wrestler making his debut on the night. The following day on CMLL's informa show he revealed that he was formerly known as Hombre Bala Jr. but chose a new ring name to make a name for himself instead of using his father's name. In August 2021, he reverted back to the Hombre Bala Jr. character. In April 2022 he won the CMLL Arena Coliseo Tag Team Championship together with Robin.

Controversy 
Drone was a subject of controversy when he allegedly wrestled drunk at the January 21 NJPW/CMLL show at Fantasticamania 2018 which gathered a lot of media attention. Drone claimed he was not drunk, but had accidentally taken too much sleep medication.

Luchas de Apuestas record

References

1991 births
Living people
Masked wrestlers
Unidentified wrestlers
Mexican male professional wrestlers
Professional wrestlers from the State of Mexico
People from Nezahualcóyotl